The Australia national cricket team toured Ceylon and India in the last three months of 1969. The team, captained by Bill Lawry, played five Test matches against India, captained by the Nawab of Pataudi Jr. The Australians also played first-class matches versus each of the five Indian Zone teams: Central, North, West, East and South. In Ceylon, they played one first-class game against Ceylon and three minor matches. Australia won the Test series in India 3–1 with one match drawn. It was to be Australia's last Test series win in India until Ricky Ponting and Adam Gilchrist's side's victory in the 2004-05 series.

Series lead up
Australia came into the series with a win under its belt against Garfield Sobers' West Indians at home the previous season. They had also retained The Ashes by drawing the 1968 series in England. Prior to the Australians' arrival, India had just managed to draw its home series against New Zealand by drawing the deciding Third Test because of rain; India had been 7/76 chasing 268.

Squads

First class games
The Australian cricket team played three minor matches in Ceylon before the first-class fixture against the Ceylonese national team on 24 October; the game was drawn. Australia's first match in India was against West Zone, a three-day match, from 31 October to 2 November, also ending in a draw.

Three-day match: West Zone vs Australians

Australia won the toss and elected to bat on a "greenish than usual" wicket. The Australians declared after scoring 340/7 in their first innings with captain and opener Bill Lawry scoring the highest, 89. In reply, West Zone captain Chandu Borde scored an unbeaten 113 before declaring after taking the score to 344/6. Ian Chappell for the Australians attacked the West Zone in their second innings, scoring eleven boundaries in his 84, taking the team's score to 150/2 at the end of third and final day's play.

Three-day match: Central Zone vs Australians

Three-day match: North Zone vs Australians

Three-day match: East Zone vs Australians

Three-day match: South Zone vs Australians

Election to bat first after winning the toss, South Zone ended day one at 204/7. An out-of-form Mansoor Ali Khan Pataudi scored 10 runs in 70 minutes before being dismissed by Australians' pacer Laurie Mayne. After captain M. L. Jaisimha declared his team's innings after they made 239, batting 55 minutes into day two, Australians got off to a strong start. Captain Bill Lawry scored 120, including three sixes, putting on 90 runs for the first wicket with Ian Redpath, who made 29. Subsequently, a middle- and lower-order batting collapse saw the team dismissed for 195. South Zone's second innings started off poorly losing two wickets for 13 runs at the end of the day's play. Declaring at 155/6, Australia were set a target of 200 runs in 170 minutes. The Australians were reduced to 53/8 in their second innings with EAS Prasanna picking up six wickets. Annoyed by defensive batting by Lawry and John Gleeson for the ninth wicket, the crowd began to hurl stones into the ground, following which the match was abandoned as a draw, with the score at 90/8, four minutes from close of play. It was reported by The Statesman that Australians' captain Bill Lawry and players Ian Redpath and Graham McKenzie allegedly assaulted "some Indian Press photographers" following the match, which was later denied by Australia team manager Fred Bennett.

Test series

First Test

The first Test was scheduled between 4 and 9 November. It was originally scheduled to be played in Ahmedabad, but was moved to Bombay due to communal riots in the city. India won the toss and batted first in front of a 40,000 strong packed stadium. Openers Dilip Sardesai and Farokh Engineer lost their wickets to a quick Graham McKenzie after a good start. Having lost three wickets for 42, Ashok Mankad (74), who was promoted up the order, and Pataudi (95), put on 146 runs, then a record stand against Australia for the fourth wicket, after being dropped once each. A subsequent middle- and lower-order collapse took the score from 202/4 at the end of day one to 271 all out shortly after lunch on day two. McKenzie finished with 5/79.

Lawry and Stackpole started off cautiously for Australia against paceman Syed Abid Ali and the spin attack. Resuming after a rest day, Stackpole reached his century at tea, and his team 322/7 by the end of the day's play. Wickets fell in quick succession the following morning, day four, to India's spinners and were all out 345. Prasanna picked five wickets, while Bedi picked three and Venkataraghavan, two.

India's top-order was dismissed cheaply in the team's innings, with Gleeson picking four of the five wickets. Post-lunch Gleeson managed to dismiss Pataudi for a duck and Chandu Borde for 8 reducing India to 59/5. Only Wadekar could offer any resistance and went on to bat for three-and-a half hours scoring 46 runs. The last hour of the day's play was marred by violence by a section of the crowd, in disapproval of umpire Sambhu Pan's decision when he declared Venkataraghavan out caught by wicket-keeper Brian Taber off Alan Connollys delivery. Play was however allowed to carry on despite bottles being hurled on the ground and chairs and canvas coverings being set on fire. The scorers request to abandon play for the day, for reasons that they could not see the signals of the on-field umpires and that they were "blinded" by smoke, was denied, when the score was 120/8. Later, the score kept by the All India Radio (AIR) commentators' box of the rest of the day's play which ended at 125/9 was accepted by the captains of the two teams. A. A. Jasdenwala, President of the Cricket Club of India that owns the stadium, decided to ban radio commentary for the following day holding one of the commentators responsible for instigating the violence. He revoked following an appeal by the AIR. India added 12 runs to the total the following morning before the final wicket fell. Set with a target of 64 in 283 minutes, Australia lost their openers for 13 runs. Australia reached the target a few minutes after lunch with Chappell and Doug Walters at the crease.

Second Test

Going into the game, India made four changes: batsmen Borde and Sardesai, and bowlers Surti and Abid Ali were dropped for Eknath Solkar and debutante Gundappa Viswanath, and Subrata Guha, Ashok Gandotra respectively, while including Ambar Roy as the twelfth man. Australia retained the team from the first Test. India captain Pataudi won the toss and opted to bat first. Mankad and Engineer got the team off to a strong start completing a 100-run partnership in 96 minutes, first for the team since January 1967. An aggressive Engineer was dismissed caught and bowled by Stackpole off his first ball, after making 77, which included 12 fours. Mankad scored his half-century when he cut Gleeson for a four after lunch, before getting out in similar manner for an Ashley Mallett delivery. Viswanath followed him without scoring a run. Including Viswanath, Alan Connolly dismissed Wadekar and Gandotra, in a display characterized by accuracy, reducing India to 197/5. India batted to stumps without further loss, ending at 237/5. On resumption of play the following day, India lost wickets at regular intervals including Pataudi in the second over to Graham McKenzie, and the lower-order to Connolly and Ashley Mallett before winding up at 320. Australia's first innings began with a 48-run stand for the first wicket before Lawry was caught at short leg by Solkar off Venkataraghavan. Stackpole was run out for 40 a few minutes later before Chappell was done in by a topspinner off Venkataraghavan. Australia closed at stumps on 105/3.

An aggressive Doug Walters struck 8 fours before losing his leg stump to a delivery from Bedi that straightened, the morning after a rest day, after he made 54. Ian Redpath, and Paul Sheahan, who till had had an ordinary tour, put on 131 for the fourth wicket. Scoring at a-run-a-minute, the innings of both batsmen were marked by strokeplays, hitting 11 and 20 fours respectively, while batting for three hours together. Sheahan reached his maiden Test century before being dismissed for 114. The tail quickly followed before the side were all out for 348, with a lead of 28 runs, when stumps were drawn. India's openers showed no trouble against Australia's pacemen McKenzie and Connolly, following which captain Lawry introduced spinner Gleeson. Mankad continued after Engineer dismissed for 21. He was bowled by a yorker off McKenzie after making 68 in 202 minutes; the latter also dismissed Pataudi in his next over for a duck reducing India to 125/4. Solkar and Viswanath struck a partnership and batted India to stumps. Viswanath reached his century the following morning, becoming only the sixth to score one on debut. It was characterized by "sound technique, mature judgement, superb footwork and wristy strokeplay." He batted for 354 minutes and the innings included 25 fours. His partner Solkar made 35, before the captain declared at 312/7 setting Australia a target of 285 runs in 130 minutes. Openers Lawry and Stackpole batted a full 130 minutes without losing a wicket, thus drawing the match.

Third Test

On 27 November, an agreement was reached between the Television Centre and the Delhi & District Cricket Association (DDCA), and it was decided that the match would be televised, the first for a Test played in India. According to the agreement, the centre was to pay the DDCA 2,000 per match-day. The wicket was described as "bald and barren" and "tailor-made for batsmen", and that spinners would play a "decisive role". Prior to the match, Australia captain Lawry had said that if he won the toss his team would win the match and that he hoped it would rain if he lost the toss. He added that he hoped to go fishing before scheduled close of the match, to which India captain Pataudi responded saying the former "will have [no] time" for it.

Australia won the toss and opted to bat first. India included Ambar Roy in place of Ashok Gandotra. Australia started off strongly making 28 runs in 20 minutes, which included Stackpole's 3 fours off Subrata Guha. Guha struck in his fourth over, minutes later, when he bowled Lawry out as he tried to drive him. Chappell settled down quickly before Bedi and EAS Prasanna were brought into the attack. Chappell edged a turning delivery off Prasanna to Solkar at backward short leg when he was on 12, but was put down. Australia went to lunch at 84/1. They lost their second wicket in Stackpole at 100, who was stumped off Bedi. His 61 off 145 minutes included 7 fours and 1 five. While Chappell reached his  half-century in 162 minutes, two wickets fell at the other end in the form of Walters and Redpath and later Sheahan, reducing his team score to 133/5. Chappell and Taber, the new batsman, went to tea without losing their wickets. A few minutes after tea, Chappell completed his fourth century and second against India, coming in 231 minutes. He put on 118 for the sixth wicket with Taber before losing his wicket to Bedi for 138. Mallet followed him after a few minutes and the team went to stumps at 261/7. The remaining wickets fell quickly the following morning and were all out at 296.

A century from Ian Chappell took Australia to 296, and then Ashley Mallett spun India out for 223, taking 6-64. However, Bishan Bedi and EAS Prasanna then took five wickets each in Australia's innings and had the tourists out for just 107, leaving India with a target of 181 for victory. Ajit Wadekar's 91 set up India's victory by seven wickets, which saw the series locked at 1-1 going into the fourth and Fifth Tests.

Fourth Test

The fourth Test started on 12 December and Australia won the toss, electing to field. McKenzie took 6-67 for Australia and ensured India's dismissal for 212. Half-centuries from Chappell and Doug Walters gave Australia a lead of 123, Bedi's 7-98 preventing a bigger Australian lead. In the second innings, Alan Connolly and Eric Freeman helped remove India for 161 and Australia needed only 42 for victory; they won by 10 wickets. Six people were killed and thirty were injured when police fired into a crowd who rushed the ticket counters before the start of the fourth day.

Fifth Test

The fifth Test began on 24 December with India needing a victory to draw the series. Batting first, Australia made 258, largely through Walters's 102, and then dismissed India for 163. However, an Indian fightback in the second innings saw Australia reduced to 6/24 at one point before Ian Redpath rescued the innings for Australia, scoring 63. Australia were all out for 153, setting India 249 for victory. Mallett took his second five-for in the match and helped Australia dismiss India for 171, Australia winning by 77 runs.

Ashley Mallett ended up being the leading wicket taker of the series with 28 wickets at an average of 19.10; the second most successful bowler was Bishan Bedi with 21 at 20.57. The leading run scorer was India's GR Viswanath with 334 runs at 47.71; Australia's Ian Chappell was the next most successful batsmen with 324 runs at 46.28.

Aftermath
The tour was to be Australia's last successful series in India until victory under Ricky Ponting and Adam Gilchrist in 2004-05. Between those series, Australia were unsuccessful on tours in 1979-80, 1996–97, 1997–98, and 2000–01; the 1986-87 tour was drawn 0–0 with the First Test a tie. India turned out to rebound from the loss by winning its next two series in the West Indies and England; they were its first series wins in those countries. Because Australia were scheduled for a tour to South Africa immediately after this series, they flew straight to South Africa for a four Test series without returning home.

References

Further reading
 Mihir Bose, A History of Indian Cricket, Andre-Deutsch, 1990
 Ramachandra Guha, A Corner of a Foreign Field: The Indian History of a British Sport, Picador India, 2001
 Wisden Cricketers' Almanack 1971

External sources
 Ceylon itinerary
 India itinerary

1969 in Australian cricket
1969 in Ceylon
1969 in Indian cricket
1970 in Australian cricket
1970 in Ceylon
1970 in Indian cricket
1969-70
1969-70
Indian cricket seasons from 1945–46 to 1969–70
International cricket competitions from 1960–61 to 1970
Sri Lankan cricket seasons from 1880–81 to 1971–72